Paenochrobactrum glaciei is a bacterium of the genus Paenochrobactrum reclassified  from Pseudochrobactrum glaciei.

References

External links
Type strain of Paenochrobactrum glaciei at BacDive -  the Bacterial Diversity Metadatabase

Hyphomicrobiales
Bacteria described in 2010